This is a list of Billboard magazine's Top Hot 100 songs of 2007.

See also
2007 in music
List of Billboard Hot 100 number-one singles of 2007
List of Billboard Hot 100 top-ten singles in 2007

References

United States Hot 100 Year End
Billboard charts